Kandhanathaswamy temple, also known as Adhi Swaminathaswamy Thirukovil, is a temple is located in the village of Eraharam near Kumbakonam in Tamil Nadu. This temple is a Sivan temple although it has Murugan as the primary deity. This temple is older than the Swaminatha Swamy Temple.

Location 
This place is located in Eraharam. This temple can be reached by the roads from Thiruppurambiyam and from Kumbakonam. This temple has river Palar a tributary of river  Kaveri  running backside of the temple and has a temple pond at its side. Even parking facility is available

Naming 
Rishis were often being attacked by the demons. So the Rishis went to Lord Shiva asking help. Lord shiva told murugan to help them and also gave murugan a weapon and said murugan to hold that place . That weapon had fallen in this particular place in earth which gave rise to the name Eraharam

Specality 
This place exists since before 9th century as this place has been sung by Nakkiranar, Kachiayappar sivachariyar and Arungirinathar

This place is mentioned in the books wrote by them. Also this  place is mentioned in the Kandha Shasti kavasam written by Devaraya Swamigal

Kumbhabhishekham 
Kumbhabhishekham to this temple had been done on 12 September 1982 and also on 19th March 2015.

Festivals 

References

1↑பு.மா.ஜெயசெந்தில்நாதன், தேவார வைப்புத்தலங்கள், வர்த்தமானன் பதிப்பகம், சென்னை, 2009

2  திருக்கோயில்கள் வழிகாட்டி, தஞ்சாவூர் மாவட்டம், தமிழ்நாடு அரசு இந்து சமய அறநிலையத்துறை, 2014

External links 
 Zvelebil, Kamil V. (1991). Tamil traditions on Subramanya – Murugan (1st ed.). Chennai, India: Institute of Asian Studies.
 Bhoothalingam, Mathuram (2011). S. Manjula (ed.). Temples of India – Myths and legends. Publications Division, Ministry of Information and Broadcasting, Government of India. .
 Clothey, Fred; Ramanujan, A.K. (1978). The many faces of Murukan: the history and meaning of a South Indian god. Mouton de Gruyter. .
 திருக்கோயில்கள் வழிகாட்டி, தஞ்சாவூர் மாவட்டம், தமிழ்நாடு அரசு இந்து சமய அறநிலையத்துறை, 2014
 திருக்குடந்தை அருள்மிகு ஆதிகும்பேசுவரசுவாமி திருக்கோயில் தல வரலாறு, 2004 (மகாமக ஆண்டு)

Temples in Tamil Nadu